Betty Smith  (11 December 1921 – 24 December 2016), known by the stage name Liz Smith, was an  English character actress, known for her roles in BBC sitcoms, including as Annie Brandon in I Didn't Know You Cared (1975–1979), the sisters Bette and Belle in 2point4 Children (1991–1999), Letitia Cropley in The Vicar of Dibley (1994–1996) and Norma ("Nana") in The Royle Family (1998–2006). She also played Zillah in Lark Rise to Candleford (2008) and won the BAFTA Award for Best Actress in a Supporting Role for the 1984 film A Private Function.

Early life
Smith was born Betty Gleadle in 1921 in the Crosby area of Scunthorpe, Lincolnshire. Her mother died when she was two. Her father walked out of her life shortly afterwards, when his new wife did not wish him to have any contact with his previous life. She was brought up by her widowed grandmother and attended Crosby Junior School and the Scunthorpe Modern and Day Commercial Schools in Cole Street. During the Second World War, she served in the Women's Royal Naval Service of the Royal Navy.

Career

Early roles
In 1971, aged 49, she had a career breakthrough when she appeared as the downtrodden mother in Mike Leigh's film Bleak Moments:

Smith starred in It's a Lovely Day Tomorrow, written by Bernard Kops and directed by John Goldschmidt, which depicted the real-life drama of the Bethnal Green Tube Disaster during World War II. A role in Hard Labour followed. After that she appeared in Emmerdale Farm (as Hilda Semple), Last of the Summer Wine, Bootsie and Snudge, Crown Court, I Didn't Know You Cared and The Sweeney. She also appeared as Madame Balls in The Pink Panther Strikes Again (1976), but her scenes were deleted and remained unseen until Trail of the Pink Panther in 1982. She was seen in Curse of the Pink Panther (1983), and later Son of the Pink Panther (1993) in the same role. 

In the 1970s and 1980s, Smith appeared in many UK television programmes, including The Duchess of Duke Street, Within These Walls, In Loving Memory, The Gentle Touch, Agatha Christie's Partners in Crime, The Life and Loves of a She-Devil, One by One as Gran Turner and The Lenny Henry Show. In 1984, Liz Smith received a BAFTA Award for Best Supporting Actress for her role as the mother of Maggie Smith's character in A Private Function.

In 1980, Smith won a role in Sir Henry at Rawlinson End as Lady Philippa of Staines. She later appeared in the thriller, Apartment Zero, which was featured in the 1988 Sundance Film Festival. Smith played the role of one of two eccentric characters (the other is Dora Bryan) described by The Washington Post as two "... tea-and-crumpet gargoyle-featured spinsters who snoop the corridors."

1990s
Smith started the 1990s by appearing in 2point4 Children (as "Aunt Belle" and "Bette"), Bottom, The Young Indiana Jones Chronicles and Lovejoy. In 1994, she played the lead role in the Children's BBC series Pirates and the supporting role of Letitia Cropley for seven episodes in The Vicar of Dibley. In the 1996 Easter Special episode the character died.

In November 1995, she made a guest appearance in the BBC1 medical drama series Casualty. In 1998, she starred in another sitcom, The Royle Family. This aired until 2000, but came back for a special episode in 2006 when her character, Nana, died. In the meantime, she had appeared in The Queen's Nose, The Bill and Secrets & Lies. In 1999, Smith was featured in A Christmas Carol as Mrs Dilber. She portrayed that same character in the 1984 version and also appeared as Miss Lory in Alice in Wonderland.

2000s and 2010s
Smith continued to act until ill-health beset her in 2009, appearing in such TV programmes as Trial & Retribution V and Doctors. In 2005, she played Grandma Georgina in the film Charlie and the Chocolate Factory and provided the voice of Mrs. Mulch in Wallace & Gromit: The Curse of the Were-Rabbit, as well as small roles in Oliver Twist and Keeping Mum.  In 2001, she appeared as herself in Lily Savage's Blankety Blank.

In 2006, Smith published her autobiography Our Betty and around the same time, moved to a retirement home in Hampstead, London. In 2007, she published a series of short stories entitled Jottings: Flights of Fancy and appeared in the Little Man Tate music video "This Must Be Love". On 5 December 2007, Smith won the Best Television Comedy Actress at the British Comedy Awards for her role in The Royle Family.

In 2006, she made a cameo appearance in Kenneth Branagh's film The Magic Flute, a version in English of the Mozart opera. However, her role did not require her to sing. She portrayed Old Papagena who, later on in the film, magically transforms into Young Papagena (played by soprano Silvia Moi) and marries the birdcatcher Papageno (played by baritone Benjamin Jay Davis).

In 2008, she starred in the first series of the period drama Lark Rise to Candleford. That same year she was a castaway on BBC Radio 4's Desert Island Discs and was in the film City of Ember, which was released in October 2008. In July 2009, she featured in a one-hour BBC Four documentary called Liz Smith's Summer Cruise, where she joined a group of like-minded individuals on a cruise from Croatia to Venice. That same month, having suffered a series of strokes a few months earlier, she announced her retirement from acting at the age of 87.

Smith was made a Member of the Order of the British Empire (MBE) in the 2009 New Year Honours.

In 2010, she took part in the BBC television programme The Young Ones, in which six celebrities in their 70s and 80s attempted to overcome some of the problems of ageing by harking back to the 1970s.

Personal life and death
In 1945, she married Jack Thomas, whom she met while on service in India. They had two children but divorced in 1959. Smith brought up her son and daughter on her own. She described this as an extremely difficult period in her life, as she struggled against financial problems and social disapproval of her status as a divorcee.

Smith died on 24 December 2016 at her home in Worthing, West Sussex, shortly after her 95th birthday. Shane Allen, controller of BBC comedy commissioning, said that Smith had "brilliantly captured the grandparent in everyone's family" as Nana in The Royle Family. Mike Leigh said "She was a complete breath of fresh air... she was not your bog standard middle-aged actress." The final episode of the lockdown edition of The Vicar of Dibley ended with a tribute just before the closing credits reading, "In loving memory of Liz, John, Emma and Roger", paying tribute to her and also three other deceased Dibley cast members (John Bluthal, Emma Chambers and Roger Lloyd-Pack).

Filmography

References

External links

Obituary: Liz Smith From BBC News

1921 births
2016 deaths
20th-century English actresses
21st-century English actresses
Actresses from Lincolnshire
Royal Navy personnel of World War II
Women's Royal Naval Service ratings
Best Supporting Actress BAFTA Award winners
English film actresses
English soap opera actresses
English television actresses
English voice actresses
Members of the Order of the British Empire
People from Scunthorpe
Women's Royal Naval Service personnel of World War II